Kendriya Vidyalaya Malappuram is a school run by Kendriya Vidyalaya Sangathan located in Malappuram, Kerala. It was established in 1986.

OUR Vision

To cater to the educational needs of the children of transferable Central Government employees including Defence and Para-Military personnel by providing a common programme of education;

To pursue excellence and set the pace in the field of school education;

To initiate and promote experimentation and innovativeness in education in collaboration with other bodies like the Central Board of Secondary Education and the National Council of Educational Research and Training, etc.

History
Kendriya Vidyalaya Malappuram was established in 1986 when the founding principal was Sri N V Namboodirpad.

Kendriya Vidyalaya Malappuram had a strength of 300 students, six teachers and two office staff to begin with in 1986. It started functioning in a rented building in Kottapady Malappuram. The   first block of its own building was ready in 1989 and two more blocks–the primary block and the laboratories were added later. Being on the slopes of a hill, its unique feature is that every floor opens to the ground at different levels.

The commerce stream was added in the academic year 2005-06. The Vidyalaya now offers Computer Science and Informatics Practice also as optional subjects. It now boasts of 1136 students and staff strength of 46.

Since its inception, the Vidyalaya has achieved great heights in academic and non-academic activities. A set of learned and dedicated  teachers and the  hard-working students together under the able leadership of the principal have  achieved  excellent  results continuously for the  past MANY  years in CBSE X and XII  exams both  qualitatively  and  quantitatively and have reached the top position in Malappuram District.

1986 – School started
1989 – New building inaugurated
1989 – First students presented for Secondary Examination CBSE.
1990 – 10+ 2 System started
1991 – Lab Block and Primary Block added.
1991 – First batch of Higher Secondary Student (Class XI) presented for Higher Secondary Examination CBSE.
2005 – Commerce stream added.

See also 
 List of Kendriya Vidyalayas

External links
Official website

References

Kendriya Vidyalayas
Kendriya Vidyalayas in Kerala
Schools in Malappuram district
Education in Malappuram
1986 establishments in Kerala
Educational institutions established in 1986